WJCM is a commercial radio station in Sebring, Florida, broadcasting to the Sebring area on 1050 AM. WJCM's format is sports, with programming from ESPN Radio.

WJCM is in Highlands County, Florida.

WJCM originally broadcast on 960 AM.  For many years the studios located in downtown Sebring on Commerce St.  On-air personalities included Ron Wilson, who also served as program director, and John Wright.

On July 1, 2016, WJCM changed their format from oldies to sports, with programming from ESPN Radio.

Translators
In addition to the main station, WJCM is relayed by an FM translator.

External links

JCM
Radio stations established in 1950
1950 establishments in Florida
Sports radio stations in the United States